Se or Seh (majuscule: Ս, minuscule: ս; Armenian: սե) is the twenty-ninth letter of the Armenian alphabet. It has a numerical value of 2000. It represents the voiceless alveolar sibilant (/s/) in both Eastern Armenian and Western Armenian. Created by Mesrop Mashtots in the 5th century AD, it is homoglyphic to the Latin letter U.

Computing codes

Related characters and other similar characters
 S s : Latin letter S
 С с : Cyrillic letter Es
 Ⴑ ⴑ ს : Georgian letter Sani
 Σ σ ς : Greek letter Sigma
 U u : Latin letter U
 ꓴ : Lisu letter U

See also
 Armenian alphabet
 Mesrop Mashtots

References

Armenian letters